"Curious" is the first single by Canadian R&B singer Danny Fernandes. The song features American rapper Juelz Santana and was produced by Pilzbury. It appears on Fernandes' first album, Intro.

Music video
The music video starts with medium shots of Fernandes and Santana, and when the music starts Fernandes and some other dancers start dancing, and there are some scenes of women posing for the camera.

Chart performance
The song debuted at number 94 on the Canadian Hot 100 on the issue of February 2, 2008 and rose a further nine spots before leaving the chart. Two months later on the issue of April 19, 2008 it re-entered the chart, peaking higher at number 65.

References

2007 songs
CP Music Group singles
2008 debut singles
Danny Fernandes songs
Juelz Santana songs
Songs written by Danny Fernandes